Auguste Lechner (2 January 1905, Innsbruck, Austria - 25 February 2000, Innsbruck, Austria) was an Austrian writer. Many of her works were aimed at an adolescent audience.

Life 

Born Auguste Neuner, Lechner studied languages at the University of Innsbruck, and in 1927 she married the managing director of the Tyrolia publishing company, Hermann Lechner. Their son Hansjörg was born in 1930.

During the 1930s, she published folk stories in various magazines, and after the Second World War she began to write books for teenage readers, concentrating predominantly on retelling classical and medieval legends and myths. Her extremely wide range of adaptations drew from Ancient Greek and Roman myths (Hercules, the Iliad, the Odyssey, the Golden Fleece and the Aeneid) as well as (King Arthur, The Song of the Nibelungs, Roland and Parzival).

With estimated total sales of over a million, she was one of the most successful authors writing in German, and her books have been translated into Dutch, Bulgarian and Korean. Among the well-known artists who provided illustrations for her works were Hans Vonmetz, Maria Rehm, Josef Widmoser and Alfred Kunzenmann.

Critical reception 

At the time Lechner was writing, she won considerable praise for her blend of entertainment and education, her mastery of language, her sensitivity to the historical material and the suspense which characterized her works. There was admiration for her ability to make the myths and legends which form an important part of Western civilization accessible to young readers.

Some of the more recent criticism has claimed that she does not explore in sufficient depth the values, customs and perspectives of the period she describes, and that her main characters are stylized and simplified. Defenders of her work have pointed out that such criticism is unfair in that the myths and legends that she draws upon could also be criticised in this way.

Awards 

 1956 Austrian State Prize for Young Literature
 1978 Listed in the VII Premio Europeo di Letteratura Giovanile, Provincia di Trento
 1983 Order of Merit of the State of Tyrol
 1985 Honorary professorship
 2005 The Song of the Nibelungs named as one of the Top Ten Books for Young People on International Children’s Book Day

Works (selected) 

 The Song of the Nibelungs, Told for Our Times, 1951
 The Adventures of Dietrich von Bern, 1953
 The Dolomite Sagas, 1955
 The Adventure of Parzifal, 1956
 The Brothers from the Cave – A Prehistoric Adventure, 1959
 The Tales of Odysseus, 1961
 The Story of Wild Hagen, Beautiful Hilde and Gudrun, 1963
 Aeneas, Son of the Goddess, 1967
 The Adventures of Don_Quixote, 1970
 The Saga of Roland, 1972
 The Iliad: The Downfall of Troy, 1973
 The Finest Fables of La Fontaine, 1976
 Hercules: his Adventures for Young People, 1977
 The Saga of the Golden_Fleece, 1980
 The History of King Arthur, 1985
 Alexander the Great, 1995

References

External links
 Biography Auguste Lechner
 Works of Auguste Lechner at the Deutschen Nationalbibliothek, Leipzig
 Work and life of August Lechner, University of Innsbruck

1905 births
2000 deaths
Austrian women writers
20th-century Austrian writers
Writers from Innsbruck
University of Innsbruck alumni
20th-century women writers